Refinaria de Paulínia or simply REPLAN is a petroleum refinery located in the city of Paulínia in the São Paulo state, in Brazil. About 80% of the processed petroleum is produced in Brazil, mostly from the Campos Basin.

In popular culture

The REPLAN refinery was destroyed in the Tom Clancy novel Dead or Alive, by terrorists hoping to undermine a deal between the United States and Petrobras to ship oil to the United States at sub-OPEC prices.

External links

Refinarias Petrobrás

Oil refineries in Brazil
Petrobras
Paulínia
Buildings and structures in São Paulo (state)